[[File:Nils Sjögren Systrarna.JPG|thumb|right|The sisters, work by Nils Sjögren]]Nils A G Sjögren''' (1894 - 1952) was a Swedish sculptor.

 Works, a selection 
Relief in the Engelbrekt room in Örebro Castle (1928)
Statues at Stockholm Public Library (1928), bronze (Adam, Eva and Krigarfigur)
Vasabrunnen (1928), bronze, Larmtorget in Kalmar, the first of a series of wells in Swedish towns 
Vågen och vindarna (1931), Tegelbacken, at Stockholms ström in Stockholm
Finn Malmgren (1931), bronze, Börjeplan in Uppsala
Olaus och Laurentius Petri (1929-34), vid Olaus Petri Church, Örebro
Systrarna (1935-45), marble, Mosebacke in Stockholm
Krönikebrunnen  (1934-39), bronze in Skara
Sjuhäradsbrunnen or Torgbrunnen (1934-41), brons, Stora torget i Borås
Melodin, at Brudlyckan in Norrköping, erected in 1948, Snigelparken in Årsta in Stockholm, erected 1953
Efter badet or Sommar (erected 1944), Reimersholme in Stockholm, by the name Sommar outside the county museum in Linköping and in Stadsträdgården in Gävle, in bronze  (erected 1947), at Guldhedstorget in Gothenburg 
Fontänen Tragos - Tragediens födelse (erected 1943), bronze, in Malmö
Cecilia, bronze, Kungsparken in Skene
De fyra elementens brunn (1941-58), bronze, Torget in Enköping
Rochdalemonumentet (1944), granite, Vår gård in Saltsjöbaden
Venus i snäckan (1950), Domarringen School in Uppsala
Mot framtiden (1950), granit, Vår gård i Saltsjöbaden
Teaterbrunnen, or Tragos (1945-53), limestone and bronze, in front of the Malmö Opera and Music Theatre in Malmö
Sjömannen (rest 1953), bronze, at Maritime Museum (Stockholm) at Djurgårdsbrunnsviken in Stockholm
Plaster fresco, at Bastugatan 21 in Stockholm
Venus i snäckan (?), (1937), fountain, bronze, at the courtyard at Birger Jarlsgatan 16 in Stockholm

References 

1894 births
1952 deaths
Swedish male sculptors
20th-century sculptors